John Heriot (born 6 January 1940) is a former Australian rules footballer who played with South Melbourne in the VFL during the 1960s.
 
He played as a  fullback although he would sometimes be pushed into the forwardline. Of skinny build, Heriot was named in the fullback position in South Melbourne's official 'Team of Century'. He typically played in short-sleeve jumpers (a compromise between the traditional sleeveless jumper and the alternatives that have long sleeves). He later coached VFA Division 2 side Yarraville.

References

External links

1940 births
Australian rules footballers from Victoria (Australia)
Sydney Swans players
Yarraville Football Club coaches
Spotswood Football Club players
Living people